Noble Savage is a 2018 Israeli drama film directed by Marco Carmel. In July 2018, it was one of five films nominated for the Ophir Award for Best Picture.

Cast
 Alon Aboutboul as Yom Tov
 Moris Cohen as Nahshon
 Liat Ekta as Sima
 Shira Haas as Anna

References

External links
 

2018 films
2018 drama films
Israeli drama films
2010s Hebrew-language films